Adélaïde Charlier (born ) is a climate activist, and one of the Belgian activists in the School strike for climate movement. She co-edited a statement for the Guardian. She, as a member of Fridays For Future, received the Ambassador of Conscience award by Amnesty International.

Life
She is studying at Collège Notre-Dame de la Paix in Namur. In 2019, with Anuna De Wever, she co-created the Belgian ‘Youth for Climate’ movement. She organized climate marches in Belgium.

References

Climate activists
Living people
Year of birth uncertain
2000s births
Youth climate activists